Tibbett is an English-language surname from the common medieval given names Tebald or Tibalt. Notable people with the name include:

 Colin Tibbett (born 1951), English cricketer
 Lawrence Tibbett (1896–1960), American opera singer and recording artist

See also 
 
 Tibbetts

References 

English-language surnames